Girolamo Conti or Girolamo de Comitibus (died 1501) was a Roman Catholic prelate who served as Bishop of Massa Marittima (1483–1501).

Biography
On 10 Sep 1483, he was appointed during the papacy of Pope Sixtus IV as Bishop of Massa Marittima.
He served as Bishop of Massa Marittima until his death in 1501.

References

External links and additional sources
 (for Chronology of Bishops) 
 (for Chronology of Bishops) 

15th-century Italian Roman Catholic bishops
16th-century Italian Roman Catholic bishops
Bishops appointed by Pope Sixtus IV
1501 deaths